Armani binti Mahiruddin (born 19 May 1957) is a Malaysian politician. She created history by being the first female holder of the Deputy President of the Dewan Negara since 2009 to 2011. Armani is a former teacher, also UMNO Women's Exco, Head of UMNO Women's Leisure Division and Director of the Lanjut Abadi Sdn Bhd Company.

Election results

Honours
  :
  Commander of the Order of Kinabalu (PGDK) - Datuk (2003)
  Companion of the Order of Kinabalu (ASDK)
  Member of the Order of Kinabalu (ADK)

References

1957 births
Kadazan-Dusun people
Living people
People from Sabah
Suluk people
Malaysian Muslims
United Malays National Organisation politicians
Sabah Heritage Party politicians
Members of the Dewan Negara
Women in Sabah politics
Women members of the Dewan Negara
21st-century Malaysian politicians
21st-century Malaysian women politicians